Kunzang Chhoden Namgyel became Bhutan's first female ambassador and the country's permanent representative to the United Nations in January 2014.

Personal life
Namgyel is a Bhutanese. She is married and she has four children, three daughters and a son.

Education
Namgyel pursued her graduation in Arts from Lady Keane College in Shillong affiliated to the North Eastern Hill University, India.

Career
In March 1980, Namgyel joined the Foreign Affairs Ministry. Since then she has held various positions over her career spanning four decades.

Some notable postings are listed as:

 Director for Bhutan at the SAARC Secretariat, Kathmandu, Nepal from October 1995 to March 1999
 Minister Counselor and Deputy Permanent Representative, Permanent Mission of the Kingdom of Bhutan to the United Nations, Geneva from July 2003 to July, 2007
 Chief of Protocol, Ministry of Foreign Affairs, Thimphu, from August 2007 to May 2009
 Director, Multilateral Department, Ministry of Foreign Affairs, Thimphu from June 2009 to August, 2011
 Ambassador Deputy Permanent Representative, Permanent Mission of the Kingdom of Bhutan to the United Nations, New York from September, 2011 until she was appointed the ambassador and permanent representative 

On January 3, 2014, she became the first woman Foreign Service officer of Bhutan appointed by a royal decree as the ambassador to United Nations. She succeeded Lhatu Wangchuk who was the Permanent Representative from early 2009 to 2013.

In November 2014, Namgyel led the Bhutanese Delegation in the second United Nations conference on Landlocked developing countries in Vienna, Austria. In the conference, Namgyel presided over the third general session of the conference. Through her statement, she highlighted the challenges that Bhutan faces as a landlocked nation. She asked the attendees to enable and promote economic growth so that the nation as a whole can build on its economy.

On April 22, 2016, Bhutan signed the Paris Agreement in New York for climate change under Namgyel's tenure as the ambassador. In her statement, Namgyel shared that Bhutan is vulnerable to the climatic changes and this agreement is a collective fight towards protecting the climate. She said that Bhutan as a nation is committed to the cause and also urged other 174 participating nations who signed the agreement to support Bhutan in this fight.

Her tenure as Permanent Representative of Bhutan to the United Nations in New York lasted until August 2017. In August 2017, Namgyel she took the position of  the Chief of Protocol in Ministry of Foreign Affairs of Bhutan.

External links
Jumping for Joy: Happiness Day 2016 at the United Nations, Event on International Happiness Day, 2016 at United Nations Headquarters
 60th Commission on women comes together for the happiness and safety of 3.6 billion women globally, CSW60 March 2016

References

Living people
Bhutanese politicians
Ambassadors of Bhutan to Bangladesh
Year of birth missing (living people)